Curling is a team sport involving moving stones across ice.

Curling may also refer to:
 Curling (metalworking), a metalworking process that forms a curled edge on sheet metal
 Curling (surname)
 Curling, Newfoundland and Labrador, a subdivision of the Canadian city of Corner Brook
 Curling bridge, a type of bridge
 Curling iron, a type of hair iron used to curl hair
 Curling's ulcer, a stress ulcer associated with severe burns
 Curling (film), a Canadian film directed by Denis Côté

See also
Curl (disambiguation)